The Gifford sisters were, save for one (Ada), prominent republicans during the Irish revolutionary period who were daughters of Frederick and Isabella Gifford, middle-class Dublin unionists. Two were married to signatories of the 1916 Proclamation.

Family background
Frederick Gifford (1835/36–1917), a Catholic solicitor, married Isabella Julia Burton (1847/48–1932), daughter of a rector in the Church of Ireland, on 27 April 1872, in St. George's Church of Ireland church in Dublin. Isabella's father, Robert Nathaniel Burton, died in her infancy, after which she and her siblings were raised by their uncle, the painter Frederic William Burton. From the 1880s, the Giffords lived on Palmerston Road in Rathmines. After a first child who died in infancy, there were six daughters and six sons. The sons (Claude Frederick, Liebert, Gerald Vere, Gabriel Paul, Frederick Ernest, and Edward Cecil), though nominally baptised as Catholics (their father's religion), remained unionist and pursued unspectacular careers outside Ireland.

The girls were educated at Alexandra College. The children were raised as Protestants, though in adulthood four sisters converted to Catholicism (Katie, Muriel, Grace, and Sidney, all having married Catholics). All the sisters, except for one (Ada), were prominent republicans.

Sisters

References

External links
 Gifford household (97 Palmerston Road, Rathmines) 1901 census and 1911 census records from National Archives of Ireland
 Bureau of Military History witness statements:
 WS 256 Nellie Donnelly
 WS 257 Grace Plunkett
 WS 909 Sidney Czira

Political families of Ireland
People educated at Alexandra College
People from Dublin (city)
19th-century Irish people
19th-century Irish women
20th-century Irish people
20th-century Irish women